Augustus Perry Blocksom (November 7, 1854 - July 26, 1931) was an American Army officer, who served as a general during World War I.

Early life
Blocksom was born on November 7, 1854 in Zanesville, Ohio.  He attended the United States Military Academy and graduated in the class of 1877.

Military career
Blocksom was commissioned as a second lieutenant of cavalry on June 15, 1877.  He later received a brevet to first lieutenant for gallantry at Ash Creek, Arizona on May 7, 1880.  He served in campaigns against the Apaches in Arizona, which included patrolling the Arizona-New Mexico border, and in the Sioux Campaign of 1890 and 1891.

During the Spanish–American War, he was wounded in the attack on Battle of San Juan Hill and served from 1900 to 1902 in the Philippines.

Blocksom, then a major, was charged with investigating the Brownsville raid of 1906 and stated that the enlisted soldiers there were uncooperative in his investigation. Blocksom also reported that no positive identifications of the raiders had been made and that tensions in the community were high.

He commanded a squadron of the Sixth Cavalry during the China Relief Expedition.

He was promoted to major general on August 5, 1917.  He was the commander of Camp Cody until April 18, 1918.

He retired on November 7, 1918.

Awards
2 Silver Citation Stars.

Death and legacy
Blocksom retired to Miami, Florida, where he died on July 26, 1931.  He was buried at Arlington National Cemetery, Section 7, Lot 8005.

References

Bibliography

1854 births
United States Army generals
United States Military Academy alumni
1931 deaths
African-American history of the United States military
Military personnel from Ohio
United States Army generals of World War I
Recipients of the Silver Star
Burials at Arlington National Cemetery